Handi Ramdhan is an Indonesian former footballer who last played for Semen Padang in the Indonesia Soccer Championship A as a defender.

He is also a Second sergeant in the Indonesian Air Force.

References
Handi Ramdhan at persija-jakarta.com

External links

Indonesian footballers
1983 births
Living people
Sundanese people
Sportspeople from Bandung
Persikab Bandung players
Persiku Kudus players
Persija Jakarta (IPL) players
Indonesian Premier League players
Indonesian military personnel
Association football defenders
Indonesia international footballers